Rexall Pharmacy Group ULC is a chain of retail pharmacies in Canada. Rexall is owned by McKesson Canada Corporation, which is a subsidiary of McKesson Corporation, a U.S.-based public company. With a history dating back to 1904, Rexall is a leading pharmacy retailer in Canada, based in Mississauga, Ontario. Rexall has approximately 400 pharmacies across Canada with 8,000 employees.

Overview
With around 400 locations Rexall is the second-largest retail pharmacy company in Canada, making it one of the major rival pharmacies to Shoppers Drug Mart. Rexall is not related to the defunct American drugstore chain with the same name, which also had locations in Canada until 1977.

The company manufactures many personal care products with Rexall branding that are sold in its locations. It also operates Rexall Direct, a national mail-order pharmacy, and Rexall Health Solutions, a division focused on providing  specialized clinical care and complex medication management services in transitional care settings.

Services and products 

 Auto Refill, RightDoseTM, Medication Dashboard and Medication Review.
 Be Well Health and Wellness Loyalty app provides a tool for patients to manage prescriptions for themselves and all their loved ones, including pets. It also enables users to connect with online health services including virtual pharmacies, doctors, and health services.
 Other online health services include virtual pharmacies, doctors, and health services. Rexall Direct online direct to consumer solution delivers medication directly to patients, anywhere in Canada.
 Rexall Care Network - is the expression of Rexall’s social purpose and the identity of the Foundation. The network aims to care for caregivers’ health and wellbeing by empowering them with information and community resources; by funding organizations that provide caregivers with direct support and assistance to enable them to continue taking care of the ones they love; and by funding programs in support of the children and older adults they care for, providing the caregiver with respite support (a break from caregiving).

Awards 

 In 2022 Rexall was recognized as One of the Best Workplaces in Canada.
 In 2022, four Rexall Private Label products won at the Retail Council of Canada (RCC)’s 29th Annual Canadian Grand Prix New Product Awards.
 In 2022 Rexall was awarded as having one of the most innovative HR Teams in Canada by Canadian HR Reporter Magazine.

History 
Rexall Canada was founded in 1904 in the early days of the United Drug Company and quickly established itself as a major retail pharmacy chain. At the same time, Tamblyn Drugs was establishing itself in Toronto, Ontario, and would eventually become Pharma Plus. These two companies would later merge and form the Rexall Pharmacy Group. 

McKesson Canada Corporation purchased Rexall in December 2016 for $3 billion from the Katz Group of Companies. At the time it was estimated that Rexall had an average annual revenue of approximately $2.0 to $2.5 billion. In 2018 the president of Rexall at that time, Beth Newlands Campbell, announced that the Pharma Plus brand would be discontinued and all stores would be converted to Rexall in order to create a more consistent look to the chain.

The company was in partnership with Air Miles, which Rexall accepted as a loyalty program. In May 2020, Rexall discontinued its partnership with Air Miles as a loyalty program at its stores and created its own loyalty program called Be Well, with which customers can collect points in order to redeem in-store items, similar to Air Miles.

References

External links 

 

Canadian pharmacy brands
2016 mergers and acquisitions
Pharmacies of Canada